Protocatechuic acid (PCA) is a dihydroxybenzoic acid, a type of phenolic acid. It is a major metabolite of antioxidant polyphenols found in green tea. It has mixed effects on normal and cancer cells in in vitro and in vivo studies.

Biological effects 
Protocatechuic acid (PCA) is antioxidant and anti-inflammatory. PCA extracted from Hibiscus sabdariffa protected against chemically induced liver toxicity in vivo. In vitro testing documented antioxidant and anti-inflammatory activity of PCA, while liver protection in vivo was measured by chemical markers and histological assessment.

PCA has been reported to induce apoptosis of human leukemia cells, as well as malignant HSG1 cells taken from human oral cavities, but PCA was found to have mixed effects on TPA-induced mouse skin tumours. Depending on the amount of PCA and the time before application, PCA could reduce or enhance tumour growth. Similarly, PCA was reported to increase proliferation and inhibit apoptosis of neural stem cells.  In an in vitro model using HL-60 leukemia cells, protocatechuic acid showed an antigenotoxic effect and tumoricidal activity. In two preclinical investigations, protocatechuic acid from Hibiscus sabdariffa showed an excellent ability to effectively inhibit the replication of herpes simplex virus type 2 and to potently deactivate the catalytic activity of urease.

Occurrence in nature 
Protocatechuic acid can be isolated from the stem bark of Boswellia dalzielii. and from leaves of Diospyros melanoxylon.

The hardening of the protein component of insect cuticle has been shown to be due to the tanning action of an agent produced by oxidation of a phenolic substance. In the analogous hardening of the cockroach ootheca, the phenolic substance concerned is protocatechuic acid.

In foods 
Açaí oil, obtained from the fruit of the açaí palm (Euterpe oleracea), is rich in protocatechuic acid. Protocatechuic acid also exists in the skins of some strains of onion as an antifungal mechanism, increasing endogenous resistance against smudge fungus.  It is also found in Allium cepa (17,540 ppm).

PCA occurs in roselle (Hibiscus sabdariffa), which is used worldwide as a food and beverage.

Protocatechuic acid is also found in mushrooms such as Agaricus bisporus or Phellinus linteus.

PCA is regarded as an active component in traditional Chinese herbal medicine such as Stenoloma chusanum (L.) Ching, Ilex chinensis Sims, Cibotium barometz (L.) J.Sm.

Metabolism 
Protocatechuic acid is one of the main catechins metabolites found in humans after consumption of green tea infusions.

Enzymes 
Biosynthesis enzymes
 3-dehydroshikimate dehydratase
 (3S,4R)-3,4-dihydroxycyclohexa-1,5-diene-1,4-dicarboxylate dehydrogenase 
 terephthalate 1,2-cis-dihydrodiol dehydrogenase 
 3-hydroxybenzoate 4-monooxygenase 
 4-hydroxybenzoate 3-monooxygenase (NAD(P)H)
 4-sulfobenzoate 3,4-dioxygenase 
 vanillate monooxygenase
 3,4-dihydroxyphthalate decarboxylase
 4,5-dihydroxyphthalate decarboxylase

 Degradation enzymes
 The enzyme protocatechuate decarboxylase uses 3,4-dihydroxybenzoate to produce catechol and CO2.
 The enzyme protocatechuate 3,4-dioxygenase uses 3,4-dihydroxybenzoate and O2 to produce 3-carboxy-cis,cis-muconate.

See also 
 Ethyl protocatechuate

References 

Dihydroxybenzoic acids
Phenol antioxidants
Vinylogous carboxylic acids
Catechols